The 1936–37 season was the 62nd season of competitive football in England.

Overview
Sunderland were the First Division defending champions. Charlton Athletic and Manchester United were promoted to the First Division the previous season.

Honours

Notes = Number in parentheses is the times that club has won that honour. * indicates new record for competition

Football League

First Division

Second Division

Third Division North

Third Division South

Top goalscorers

First Division
Freddie Steele (Stoke City) – 33 goals

Second Division
Jack Bowers (Leicester) – 33 goals

Third Division North
Ted Harston (Mansfield Town) – 55 goals

Third Division South
Joe Payne (Luton Town) – 55 goals

National team
The England national football team suffered a poor season in which they came third in the 1936-37 British Home Championship after only managing to defeat Ireland in between losses to Scotland and Wales.

References